Tim Anderson (born 13 December 1978) is a New Zealand former cricketer. He played in one List A and 16 first-class matches for Central Districts from 1997 to 2003.

References

External links
 

1978 births
Living people
New Zealand cricketers
Central Districts cricketers
Cricketers from Palmerston North